The 1969 Women's College World Series of softball. It was organized by the Omaha Softball Association and recognized by the Division for Girls' and Women's Sports (DGWS) as a championship tournament. Softball teams from nine colleges met on May 16–18 in Omaha and Fremont, Nebraska. A tenth team from the Philippines encountered a travel delay en route and was forced to miss the tournament. The first day of games was rained out, causing the 16 games to be played in two days. Connie Claussen, the chair of the physical education department at the University of Nebraska–Omaha, was a driving force in organizing and directing that first tournament, as well as the next ten while the series was held in Omaha.

Teams
The double-elimination tournament included these teams:

 Black Hills State College (South Dakota)
 Colorado State College (now University of Northern Colorado)
 Creighton University (Nebraska)
 Illinois State University 
 John F. Kennedy College (Nebraska)
 Kearney State College (Nebraska)
 St. Petersburg Junior College (Florida)
 Southwest Missouri State College
 University of Nebraska–Omaha

Far Eastern University of Manila was also expected to compete; however, mechanical issues with their airplane forced them to forfeit.

The John F. Kennedy College Patriettes won the first college softball championship by winning all five of their games, defeating Illinois State in the final, 2–0. Patriettes pitcher Judy Lloyd was named the Most Outstanding Player of the tournament.

Bracket
The bracket, which was originally planned to be a ten-team tournament, included nine teams, with results as shown.

Ranking

See also

References

Women's College World Series
Soft
American
Amer
Women's sports in Nebraska